Wilmarys Del Valle Moreno Duran (born 16 May 1993) is a Venezuelan racing cyclist. Moreno won both the Venezuelan National Time Trial Championships and the Venezuelan National Road Race Championships in 2019 and 2021.

Major results
Source: 

2010
 2nd Road race, National Junior Road Championships
2011
 1st  Road race, National Junior Road Championships
2012
 6th Road race, National Road Championships
 6th Copa Federacion Venezolana de Ciclismo Corre
 7th Clasico Aniversario De La Federacion Veneolana
2013
 9th Road race, National Road Championships
2014
 National Road Championships
3rd Road race
3rd Time trial
 7th Time trial, Central American and Caribbean Games
 9th Clasico FVCiclismo Corre Por la VIDA
2015
 National Road Championships
2nd Road race
2nd Time trial
 4th Copa Federación Venezolana de Ciclismo
 10th Clasico FVCiclismo Corre Por la VIDA
2016
 3rd Copa Federación Venezolana de Ciclismo
 5th Road race, Pan American Road Championships
 7th Road race, National Road Championships
2017
 5th Road race, National Road Championships
2018
 National Road Championships
2nd Road race
2nd Time trial
 8th Road race, South American Games
2019
 National Road Championships
1st  Road race
1st  Time trial
 5th Overall Tour Femenino de Venezuela II
 7th Road race, Pan American Games
 8th Tour Femenino de Venezuela I
2020
 3rd Time trial, National Road Championships
2021
 National Road Championships
1st  Road race
1st  Time trial
2022
 3rd Time trial, National Road Championships
 6th Road race, South American Games

References

External links

1993 births
Living people
Venezuelan female cyclists
Cyclists at the 2019 Pan American Games
Pan American Games competitors for Venezuela
20th-century Venezuelan women
21st-century Venezuelan women
Competitors at the 2018 South American Games
Competitors at the 2022 South American Games